The Latter Day Church of Christ, is considered a Mormon fundamentalist denomination by some in the Latter Day Saint movement.  Also known as the LDCJC, the Kingston Clan, and The Order, it is a religious organization created by members of the Davis County Cooperative Society or DCCS in 1977.  The Cooperative itself was established in 1935.  Upon the creation of the LDCJC, most members of the DCCS became members of the church and most retain dual membership in both organizations to this day. There are approximately 3,500 members, some of whom are known to practice polygamy.

Establishment

According to his autobiography, Charles W. Kingston became disenchanted with the Church of Jesus Christ of Latter-day Saints (LDS Church) in 1926 because it abandoned plural marriage. Kingston began preaching polygamy amongst fellow members of the LDS Church and distributing pamphlets and the book he had co-written, Laman Manasseh Victorious: A Message of Salvation and Redemption to His People Israel, First to Ephraim and Manasseh. This resulted in his excommunication from the LDS Church in 1929. By 1935, his followers began to move to Bountiful, Utah, intending to live under a United Order communal program as defined by Joseph Smith in the Doctrine and Covenants. On February 7, 1941, the community founded by Elden Kingston officially declared themselves the Davis County Cooperative Society Inc. The corporation produces goods and services that are used by members, and sold or traded to other cooperatives and to the public. In 1977, Elden's brother Ortell Kingston began to file for legal recognition of the church later organized as The Latter Day Church of Christ.

The Latter Day Church of Christ is based in Salt Lake City, Utah, with a presence in Bountiful, Utah.

Finances

Over the decades, the Cooperative has maintained extreme secrecy while developing an extensive system with assets once estimated at over $150 million. Some of their secrecy might be attributed to a fear of arrest for living in plural marriages, as had happened in 1959–1960 when being investigated by the Davis County Grand Jury, which some members claimed was organized by LDS Apostles Mark E. Peterson and Spencer W. Kimball. The Grand Jury was described as "The polygamist hunting Davis County Grand Jury" by the Ogden Standard-Examiner in 1959.  That same year, Ardous Kingston Gustafson, a mother of four and founding Co-op member, was jailed on Christmas Eve when she could not produce membership lists that were to be used to target plural families for further arrest and harassment.

The Cooperative had its birth during the Great Depression when many families struggled immensely to provide for their families. For many years, members of the Co-operative lived in poor conditions, and those in need had no legal  way to apply for assistance. Long-time leader John Ortell Kingston lived in a small one-story clapboard house in Salt Lake City up until the time of his death in 1987. Over the past 25 years, many members have become college-educated and live in middle-to-upper-middle-class homes throughout their communities. Currently the group claims that although different skillsets bring different financial outcomes, there is no homelessness within the DCCS, and internal programs exist for those experiencing financial poverty.

Members' financial holdings are believed to include: a  dairy farm in Davis County; a  farm in Tetonia, Idaho; a coal mine in Emery County;  in Terreton, Idaho; a cattle ranch and a discount store; Desert Tech Firearms; a grocery store; and a restaurant supply in many western cities including Tucson, Phoenix, Denver, Las Vegas, Boise, and Portland.

J. Ortell Kingston aggressively pursued a financially-expansive agenda for the Davis County Cooperative Society Inc. in the hopes of improving the financial condition of his followers.

Beliefs
The Latter Day Church of Christ is based on a belief in Jesus Christ and the restoration of his gospel in these latter days. It is not affiliated with the mainstream LDS Church. Doctrinally, members of the LDCJC try to adhere to the teachings of the Bible, the Book of Mormon, the Doctrine and Covenants, and the Pearl of Great Price. Members of the Latter Day Church of Christ are also members of the Davis County Cooperative Society (a separate organization and legal entity) which practices the law of consecration and United Order. Some members had begun the practice of plural marriage years before the establishment of the cooperative.

During the first years of the Davis County Cooperative Society, Elden Kingston and his followers wore unique blue denim outer garments that led to people referring to them as "blue-coats."  Men and boys wore blue coverall-type suits tied with strings; women and girls wore plain blue denim dresses. As a symbol of their renunciation of worldly goods, the outer clothing contained no pockets in which possessions could be carried, although later an inside pocket was provided for the sanitary measure of carrying a handkerchief. All went bareheaded and barefoot. This practice lasted only a short time and was abandoned sometime before 1940. Members today wear normal modern clothing, although they are encouraged to be modest and keep a high standard of dress.

Plural marriage is practiced by some members of the LDCJC and members make their own choice in who they marry. Some members of the church are also believed to practice consanguineous marriage, or marriage to relatives within the group. This practice has been attributed to "endogamous preference and the small size of the group’s population" according to recent research from the University of California. The group claims no preference for any particular family or surname stating members join every year "from a variety of different backgrounds and surnames."

According to a 2011 document prepared by the attorneys general of the states of Utah and Arizona, the church describes itself as emphasizing family values, education, self-sufficiency, and the belief that every child is a priceless blessing. Children are allowed to attend public school and many go on to college.

Controversies

Consanguineous marriages

In the late 1990s, three members of the LDCJC faced scrutiny for entering into incestuous relationships. During this time, some non-members and ex-members began claiming the practice stemmed from theories of genetic purification held by past leaders.

These cases included:
 Jason Kingston allegedly had a relationship with his half-sister Andrea Johnson, who became pregnant in 1992.  She suffered from preeclampsia before being brought in for medical treatment. A C-section was performed to save the baby, but Andrea died. Salt Lake County officials opened an investigation into the possibility that obstetrical care was withheld to conceal the relationship. 
 Jeremy Kingston was sentenced to a year in prison in 2004 for taking LuAnn Kingston, his cousin and aunt, as his fourth wife in 1994; their relationship began when he was 24 and she was 15.
 David Kingston is alleged to have married his 16-year-old niece Mary Ann Nelson, who attempted to run away but was apprehended and beaten by her father, John Daniel Kingston. He was arrested and pleaded “no contest” to the charge of child abuse and served seven months in jail. David Kingston was convicted of incest and unlawful sexual conduct and sentenced to a 10-year prison term, of which he served four years. Mary Ann later filed a $110-million lawsuit against other members of the Cooperative, alleging intentional sexual abuse of a child and intentional infliction of emotional distress, but the lawsuit was eventually dropped without any settlement.
Active members and a recent independent research article by a professor from Santa Clara University have attributed the practice to "endogamous preference and the small size of the group’s population". These relationships are defined as incestuous according to Utah's Criminal Code 76-7-102 (2021), which states: "Related person" means a person related to the provider or actor as an ancestor, descendant, brother, sister, uncle, aunt, nephew, niece, or first cousin, and includes: (i) blood relationships of the whole or half blood without regard to legitimacy; (ii) the relationship of parent and child by adoption; and (iii) the relationship of stepparent and stepchild while the marriage creating the relationship of a stepparent and stepchild exists.

Pedophilia and underaged marriage
The Kingston family and other members of the LDCC have faced two lawsuits, one in 2006 and another in 2022 accusing members and the organization as a whole of sexual abuses, including pedophilia and underaged marriages, within their membership. The 2022 complaint was filed by attorney, Roger Hoole, an attorney known for representing ex-members of the polygamous Fundamentalist Church of Jesus Christ of Latter-Day Saints. In 2009, the then-Attorney General of Utah, Mark Shurtleff, claimed that child marriages within polygamous societies in Utah, such as the Latter Day Church of Christ, had "effectively stopped". Despite this, the latest suit alleges marriages as young as 16 within the Latter Day Church of Christ have continued. The suit includes ten former members alleging the organization used marriages to "unlawfully make girls and their children religious martyrs and traffic them for sexual and labor purposes".

The organization continues to publicly denounce the practice of child marriage, and maintains that marriages within the group are not coerced. In 2007, the group told Deseret News that it was encouraging its members to wait until their partners were 18 to marry them, with one member reporting that "we do encourage them to be 18 now". Responding to child marriage allegations in September 2022, the organization told The Guardian that "current policy prohibits plural marriage for members under 18" and "once an individual has made a decision on who to marry, members are encouraged to seek the blessing of their parents, family and/or church leaders, but to say that one individual chooses or heavily influences who will marry who is entirely inaccurate".

Financial fraud
In 2016, the State of Utah with federal law enforcement raided various properties in connection with the Kingston family or Davis County Cooperative Society with the intention of finding welfare fraud. The State of Utah stated: "It was a specific investigation that we were approached by [federal law enforcement] to participate in."  After two years of investigating, they did not find any welfare fraud. "State investigators found no wrongdoing among members of the Davis County Cooperative Society, also known as the Kingston Group."  Members claim they have been broadly and unfairly targeted by authorities for the negative actions of a small few. Members allege to have been targeted for audit at a rate over 9x the published IRS average for the general population, with no pattern of fraud being found outside of a couple of bad-actors.

In July 2019, Jacob Kingston, Isaiah Kingston, and two others pled guilty to participating in a fraud scheme masterminded by Lev Derman, a non-member and Armenian national. The scheme included filing for $512 million in federal renewable-fuel tax credits from 2010 to 2016 through a company named Washakie Renewable Energy LLC. One of the guilty pleas states they “cycled” fraud proceeds through a number of international partners and then back to Washakie's bank accounts, falsely claiming them as loans or profits. A small portion of the funds (less than 6%) were also used to purchase legitimate goods and services from businesses who provided them in "good faith".  Legitimate businesses, including those in the Cooperative, argued that Jacob hid the scheme from business partners as well as Co-op leadership. The remainder of the transactions (over 94%) were to entities associated with Lev Derman, who prosecutors allege was the mastermind of the scheme. Derman was found guilty of masterminding the scheme in March 2020. As part of the plea deal and restitution, the company forfeits rights to a number of assets including their bio-fuel plant in Plymouth, Utah. WRE has since become defunct.

Davis County Cooperative leadership and members swiftly condemned the fraudulent behavior stating that "[Jacob] broke from tradition in many ways" and stressing "to members and non-members alike that this behavior is not in line with our beliefs or principles." And, "We cannot and will not condone or support anyone found to be engaged in any fraudulent behaviors." In a recent lawsuit, ex-members allege that the WRE case was an example of the concept of "bleeding the beast." However, the group reiterated its belief that "bleeding the beast" was "abhorent" and was "never a tenet" of its organization.

Leaders
 Paul Elden Kingston, (1987–current)
 John Ortell Kingston (1948–87)
 Elden Kingston (1935–48)
 Charles W. Kingston (founder's father, patriarch, supported leaders from 1935 until his death in 1975)

Member Assets

The Utah holdings of Davis County Cooperative members were once estimated at more than $200 million, and were believed to include the following:

 A-1 Disposal
 A & W Restaurants
 AAA Communications
 AAA Security
 Advance Copy & Printing
 Advance Vending
 American Digital Systems
 American Wellness & Rehab Clinic, LLC
 Amusement Games (defunct)
 Arrow Real Estate and Property Compliance
 Arvesta LLC (Dallas, Pennsylvania)
 Best Distributing
 The Co-op Mine in Huntington (defunct)
 Collin Media, LLC
 Commercial Agent Services, LLC
 Davis County Cooperative Society Inc.
 Desert Tech
 East Side Market (defunct)
 Ensign Learning Academy
 Ensign Learning Center
 Ensign Shoe
 Factory Outlet Stores
 Family First Medicine
 Family Stores True Value
 Fidelity Funding Corporation
 Fountain of Youth Health and Athletic Club
 Fountain of Youth Spas
 Garco
 Garrad's Heating and Air Conditioning, Inc.
 Hiawatha
 John's Marketplace
 Kingston Corporation of the Church of Jesus Christ of Latter
 Little Red School House (defunct)
 Mountain Count Machines Distributors
 Premier Catering & Food Services, LLC
 Ralph's Milk Farm
 Redwood Grocery & Health Foods
 Shoppers Pawn
 Spiffy Ice (defunct)
 Sportsmans Pawn
 Standard Industries
 Standard Restaurant Supply, Inc.
 Standard Restaurant Equipment Company
 Vanguard Academy
 Washakie Farm
 Washakie Ranch
 Washakie Renewable Energy (defunct)
 World Enterprises
 Xtreme Pawn
 Zion Ponderosa Ranch Resort
 ZMPC9

See also

 Factional breakdown: Mormon fundamentalist sects
 List of Mormon fundamentalist churches
 List of Mormon fundamentalist leaders
 Mormonism and polygamy

References

Mormon fundamentalist denominations
Davis County, Utah
Latter Day Saint movement in Utah
Organizations based in Utah
Christian organizations established in 1977
1977 establishments in Utah
Christian denominations established in the 20th century